Juan Padrós Rubió (1 December 1869 – 11 May 1932) was a Spanish businessman who was recognised as the 2nd official President of Real Madrid.

He first took office on 6 March 1902, about 2 years after Real Madrid was created.

He remained as president until January 1904, when he was succeeded by his brother, Carlos Padrós. Both of them were Catalan businessmen from Barcelona who had moved to Madrid.

References

1869 births
1932 deaths
People from Barcelona
Spanish businesspeople
Real Madrid CF presidents